The 2022 Philadelphia City Council special elections are planned special elections in 2022. The reason for the special elections is at least five resignations from the Philadelphia City Council.

Resignations 

 Bobby Henon, resigned from his 6th District (Democratic) seat on January 20, 2022 due to being convicted on corruption charges.
 Allan Domb, resigned from his At-Large (Democratic) seat on August 15, 2022 to explore a run in the 2023 Philadelphia mayoral election
 Maria Quiñones-Sánchez, resigned from her 7th District (Democratic) seat on September 6, 2022 to run in the 2023 Philadelphia mayoral election
 Derek S. Green, resigned from his At-Large (Democratic) seat on September 6, 2022 to run in the 2023 Philadelphia mayoral election
 Cherelle Parker, resigned from her 9th District (Democratic) seat on September 7, 2022 to run in the 2023 Philadelphia mayoral election

6th District 
Bobby Henon resigned due to conviction of corruption charges leading to a special election. City Council President Darrell L. Clarke announced a special election to fill Henon's seat on May 17, 2022. The Democratic nominee ran unopposed.

Democratic Party 

 Michael Driscoll, State Representative

7th District 
Maria Quiñones-Sánchez resigned due to her run for Mayor leading to a special election. City Council President Darrell L. Clarke called a special election to fill Quinones-Sanchez's seat on November 8, 2022.

Democratic Party 

Quetcy Lozada, community organizer and chief of staff for incumbent Maria Quiñones-Sánchez

Republican Party 

James Whitehead

Libertarian Party 

Randall Justus

9th District 
Cherelle Parker resigned due to her run for Mayor leading to a special election. City Council President Darrell L. Clarke is called to call a special election to fill Parker's seat on November 8, 2022.

Democratic Party 

Anthony Phillips, community organizer

Republican Party 

Roslyn Ross

Libertarian Party 

Yusuf Jackson

At-Large Seats 
Allan Domb and Derek S. Green resigned due to their both possible runs for Mayor leading to a special election. City Council President Darrell L. Clarke is expected to call a special election in 2023. But the seats may only be filled at the regular scheduled election.

Seat 1

Democratic Party 

Jim Harrity, former aide to state senator Sharif Street

Republican Party 

Drew Murray, Ward leader for the Philadelphia Republican Party

Libertarian Party 

Poetica Bey

Seat 2

Democratic Party 

Sharon Vaughn, chief of staff for incumbent Derek S. Green

Republican Party 

Jim Hasher, realtor and bar owner

Libertarian Party 

Marc Jurchak, chair of the Libertarian Party of Philadelphia

References 

2022 United States local elections
2022 Pennsylvania elections
Philadelphia City Council elections

Pennsylvania special elections